Craig Peter Gurr (born 8 February 1973) is a former Zimbabwean cricketer. A wicket-keeper, he played one first-class match for Mashonaland A during the 1998–99 Logan Cup. He also played for Zimbabwe Cricket Union President's XI and Zimbabwe A.

References

External links
 
 

1973 births
Living people
Cricketers from Harare
Mashonaland A cricketers
Zimbabwean cricketers
Wicket-keepers